Amphisbaena is a genus in the family Amphisbaenidae, commonly known as worm lizards.  Over 100 species are placed in this diverse genus.

Species

Nota bene: A binomial authority in parentheses indicates that the species was originally described in a genus other than Amphisbaena.

Nota bene: A binomial authority in parentheses indicates that the species was originally described in a genus other than Amphisbaena.

Etymology
The specific names carlgansi, carli, and cegei are all in honor of American herpetologist Carl Gans (1923–2009), for his contributions to the knowledge of Amphisbaenians.

See also
 List of reptiles of Brazil
 Sineoamphisbaena

References

Further reading

Gans C (2005). "Checklist and Bibliography of the Amphisbaenia of the World". Bull. American Mus. Nat. Hist. (289): 1–130.
Linnaeus C (1758). Systema naturæ per regna tria naturæ, secundum classes, ordines, genera, species, cum characteribus, differentiis, synonymis, locis. Tomus I. Editio Decima, Reformata. Stockholm: L. Salvius. 824 pp. (Amphisbæna, new genus, p. 229).

 
Taxa named by Carl Linnaeus